is a  Japanese university in Machida, Tokyo, Japan. The university consists of 16 departments in seven faculties (undergraduate), as well as seven programs leading to a master's degree and four programs leading to a doctorate degree. Part of the Tamagawa Gakuen campus, the school was founded by Japanese education reformer Kuniyoshi Obara.

Undergraduate colleges
 College of Humanities
 College of Agriculture
 College of Engineering
 College of Business Administration
 College of Education
 College of Arts
 College of Arts and Sciences

Graduate schools
 Graduate School of Humanities
 Graduate School of Agriculture
 Graduate School of Engineering
 Graduate School of Management
 Graduate School of Education
 Graduate School of Education (Teaching profession)
 Graduate School of Brain Sciences

Notable alumni
Masami Akita
Yuichiro Hata
Chen Kenichi 
Masaharu Morimoto
Shunmyō Masuno
Sayaka Murata
Hiroko Yakushimaru
Chiba Yudai
Inio Asano

References

External links
 Official website

Educational institutions established in 1929
Private universities and colleges in Japan
Universities and colleges in Tokyo
Western Metropolitan Area University Association
Machida, Tokyo
1929 establishments in Japan